Butkiewicz is a Polish-language surname. A variant of Budkiewicz, it is derived from the given name Budka. The surname is most frequent in north-eastern Poland. It is related to surnames in several other languages.

People 
Andrzej Butkiewicz (1955–2008), Polish political activist
John Butkiewicz, Australian field lacrosse player
Michał Butkiewicz (born 1942), Polish fencer

References 

Polish-language surnames